Bed is the third solo album by American singer-songwriter Juliana Hatfield, released in 1998 by Zoë Records.

Recording
Bed was written in a few weeks, and recorded and mixed from March 9 to March 15, 1998 at Sound Station Seven in Providence, Rhode Island. Hatfield chose to record the album with a stripped-down sound and did not favor any digital processing effects. According to her, "I had just been listening to things that were very raw and dry, the kind of things where you can really hear all the instruments very close to your ear when you have headphones on. I guess I was feeling raw, and I didn't want to pretty it up or put anything on top of it."

Reception

Writing for CMJ New Music Monthly, reviewer Brett Milano praised the album, stating that its songs have more depth than Hatfield's earlier MTV hits. Although he admitted that some tracks sounded a bit rushed, he felt that the album has enough gems to keep it interesting.

Track listing

Personnel
Musicians
Juliana Hatfield – guitar, keyboards, vocals
Todd Philips – percussion, drums
Mikey Welsh – bass

Technical
Producer: Juliana Hatfield
Engineer: Jon Williams
Package design: Tom Bonauro, Jim Goldberg
Design assistant: Richard Turtletaub
Photography: Jim Goldberg

References

1998 albums
Juliana Hatfield albums
Zoë Records albums